Simon House (born 29 August 1948 in Nottingham, Nottinghamshire, England) is a British composer and classically trained violinist and keyboard player, perhaps best known for his work with space rock band Hawkwind.

Career 
Before his time with Hawkwind, House played in High Tide and the Third Ear Band, who contributed the soundtrack to Roman Polanski's Macbeth. Guitarist Tony Hill recounted how House became a member of High Tide: "[Pete Pavli and I were] hanging out with" and crashing where we could at Mike's or Wayne's. Simon ended up crashing there as well. Simon was playing bass then. He said: 'I used to play violin, you know?' So I said 'Get it!' That was basically it."

He joined Hawkwind in 1974. His arrival introduced a new element to the band's style. He was the first conspicuously trained musician to join, and the sound that emerged on Hall of the Mountain Grill was a previously unheard, lush chaos which sounded reminiscent of a fusion of Black Sabbath and The Moody Blues. He left the group for David Bowie's band in 1978. That, along with Robert Calvert falling into clinical depression, led to Hawkwind breaking up in mid-tour.

Along with other Hawkwind members he as a session musician for science fiction author Michael Moorcock's New Worlds Fair in 1975 and has also played on solo projects by former Hawkwind members Robert Calvert and Nik Turner.

Since the 1970s, as well as cutting an album (Interesting Times) with Tony Hill under the High Tide banner and releasing several solo albums under his own name, House has twice rejoined Hawkwind; between 1989 and 1991, and between 2001 and 2003.

Discography

High Tide
 Sea Shanties (1969)
 High Tide (1970)
 Interesting Times (1986)
 Precious Cargo (1989)
 The Flood (1990)

Denny Gerrard
 Sinister Morning (1970)

Third Ear Band
 Music from Macbeth (1972)
 The Magus (recorded 1972, released 2004)

Hawkwind
 Hall of the Mountain Grill (1974)
 Warrior on the Edge of Time (1975)
 Astounding Sounds, Amazing Music (1976)
 Quark, Strangeness and Charm (1977)
 PXR5 (1979)
 Lord of Light (1987)
 Space Bandits (1989)
 Palace Springs (1990)
 Live in Nottingham 1990 (2004)
 Anthology, 1967-1982 (1998)
 Stasis: The U.A. Years, 1971-1975 (2003)
 Yule Ritual (2002)
 Canterbury Fayre 2001 (2002)
 The Weird Tapes No. 5: Live '76 & '77 (2001)

Michael Moorcock & The Deep Fix
 New Worlds Fair (1975)

Robert Calvert
 Lucky Leif and the Longships (1975)
 Hype: Songs of Tom Mahler (1981)
 Revenge

David Bowie
 Stage (1978)
 Lodger (1979)
 Sound + Vision (2001)
 Welcome to the Blackout (recorded in 1978) (2018)

Japan
 Tin Drum (1981)
 Gentlemen Take Polaroids/Tin Drum/Oil on Canvas (1994)
 Exorcising Ghosts (2004)

David Sylvian
 Everything and Nothing (2000)

Thomas Dolby
 She Blinded Me With Science (1982)
 The Golden Age of Wireless [Re-released version](1982)
 The Best of Thomas Dolby: Retrospectacle (1994)

Mike Oldfield
 "Crises" (1983) [2013 Deluxe Edition only]
 The Complete Mike Oldfield (1985)

Magic Muscle
 One Hundred Miles Below (1989)
 Gulp (1991)

Nik Turner
 Prophets of Time (1994)
 Transglobal Friends and Relations (2000)
 Space Gypsy (2013)
 Life In Space (2017)

Simon House
 Yassasim (1995)
 Spiral Galaxy Revisited (2005)

Simon House with Rod Goodway
 House of Dreams (2002)

Spiral Realms
 A Trip to G9 (1994)
 Crystal Jungles of Eos (1995)
 Solar Wind (1996)
 Ambient Voids: A Hypnotic Compilation (1995)

Anubian Lights
 The Eternal Sky (1995)
 Jackal & Nine (1996)

Ambient Time Travellers
 Ambient Time Travellers (1995)

Adrian Shaw
 Head Cleaner (2000)

Bedouin
 As Above So Below (2001)

Earth Lab
 Element (2006)

Judy Dyble
 Enchanted Garden (2004)
 Spindle (2006)
 The Whorl (2006)

Astralasia
 Cluster of Waves (2007)
 Away With the Fairies (2007)

Spirits Burning
 Earthborn (2008)
 Bloodlines (2009)

Nektar
 A Spoonful of Time (2008)

Alan Davey
 Eclectic Devils (2009)

Albums in process

Psychestra
 Psychestra (demo, 2009)

Dark Chemistry
 Romance of Desolation (demo, 2009)

Comitatus
 Portable Casanova (demo, 2009)

References

External links

 Myspace page for Simon House Official web site
  Dark Chemistry Official web site
 Myspace page for Dark Chemistry Official web site
 Myspace page for Psychestra Official web site
 Astralasia Official web site
 
 

1948 births
Living people
People educated at Nottingham High Pavement Grammar School
People from Nottingham
English keyboardists
Hawkwind members